"Mary Mac" was the second single released by Australian rock band The Blackeyed Susans from their fourth studio album, Mouth To Mouth.  It was released on the Hi Gloss Record label in October 1996, three months after the album's release. The song was recorded as part of the band's recording of Mouth to Mouth during the autumn of 1995 at the Fortissimo Sound Studios in Melbourne. The single proved to be the band’s most successful thus far and the song an essential part of The Blackeyed Susans' catalog. The B-sides were bonus tracks, comprising: a cover of The Go-Betweens song, "Dive for Your Memory"; a cover of Canadian country music artist Hank Snow's "Ninety Miles Per Hour"; and an original, "Someone Watching Over Me", which was recorded by Phil Kakulas on an 8-track in a spare room in Abbotsford 1992.

In a review of the album on AllMusic, Ned Raggett describes the lyrics of the song as being "unsurprisingly not quite as easygoing as the music" and the backing vocals from Kathryn Wemyss as adding "to the jaunty feeling of the piece". In David Landgren's album review he states that "after you've heard it [Mary Mac] a couple of times it's difficult to avoid not wanting to singing along (i.e.: bellowing at the top of your voice) yourself."

Track listing

Personnel

Musicians
Track 1
Rob Snarski - vocals, guitars, robeno
Phil Kakulas - bass, percussion
Kiernan Box - piano, organ
Dan Luscombe - fuzz guitar
Kathryn Wemyss - backing vocals
Nick Elliott - tambourine
Ashley Davies - drums
Track 2
Rob Snarski - vocals, guitars
Phil Kakulas - electric, double bass
Kiernan Box - piano, organ
Track 3
Rob Snarski - vocals, guitars
Phil Kakulas - electric, double bass
Kiernan Box - piano, organ
Track 4
Rob Snarski - vocals
Phil Kakulas - bass, shaker
David McComb - guitar
'Evil' Graham Lee - guitar

Production credits 
 Phil Kakulas - Producer (tracks 1 and 2), Recording (track 4), Mixing (track 4)
 Victor van Vugt - Recording (track 1) 
 Andy Parsons - Recording (tracks 2 and 3), Mixing (track 2)
 Tony Cohen - Mixing (tracks 1 and 3)
 Julian Wu - Mixing (track 4)
 Don Bartley - Mastering
 Tony Mahony - Photography

References

The Blackeyed Susans songs
1996 singles
1995 songs